PGA Tour 98 is a sports video game developed by NuFX and published by EA Sports exclusively for PlayStation in 1997. It was the last game in the series to not feature an athlete's name in the title until EA Sports PGA Tour in 2023.

Reception

The game received average reviews. Next Generation said that the game "may be one of the best PlayStation golf games by default – it's one of the only PlayStation golf games. But at least it's actually worth playing this year." GamePro praised the animations, detailed courses, commentary, and challenging gameplay, criticized the pixelation of the graphics in close ups and the distracting background sounds, and, similarly to Next Generation, concluded that despite its flaws PGA Tour 98 was "definitely the best golf game released for any 32-bit system."

IGN criticized the game's slow loading times and dated sprite-based graphics. Electronic Gaming Monthlys four reviewers were split about the game. Crispin Boyer and Ken "Sushi-X" Williams gave it an 8 and a 7.5 respectively, particularly praising how the game enables players to enjoy it in either a casual, beginner-friendly manner or an intense, detail-obsessed manner, while Kraig Kujawa and guest reviewer David Siller gave it a 4.5 and a 7 respectively, citing the long load times between the swing meter and the actual swing, which they said slows down an already slow-paced sport.

Notes

References

External links
 

1997 video games
EA Sports games
Golf video games
NuFX games
PlayStation (console) games
PlayStation (console)-only games
Video games developed in Canada